Al Mustaqilla, or The Independent, was a bi-weekly newspaper published in Baghdad, Iraq.

History and profile
Al Mustaqilla was started after the removal of Saddam Hussein. It was published in Arabic language. Its editor-in-chief was Dhari Al Duleimi and the managing editor was Mu'ayyad Al Samsam.

The paper was ordered shut down by the Coalition Provisional Authority on 22 July 2003, after it was accused of publishing an article inciting readers to "commit murder." The managing editor was also arrested.

See also
 Al Hawza

References

2003 disestablishments in Iraq
Arabic-language newspapers
Biweekly newspapers
Defunct newspapers published in Iraq
Mass media in Baghdad
Publications with year of establishment missing
Publications disestablished in 2003